John Eyre (June 1824 – May 13, 1882) was an Ontario lawyer and political figure. He represented Northumberland East in the Legislative Assembly of Ontario as a Liberal from 1867 to 1871.

He was born in Launceston, Cornwall, United Kingdom in 1824 and came to Cobourg with his family in 1832. He was admitted to practice as an attorney in 1851. He settled at Brighton in 1853 and married Calista Stevens, granddaughter of bishop John Reynolds, in 1856. Eyre was defeated in the 1871 election for the same seat by William Wilson Webb. He was one of the original shareholders of the Brighton Wharf Company.

Eyre's former residence in Brighton is known as the White House. King Edward VII was a guest there.

External links 
 The Canadian parliamentary companion H. J. Morgan (1869)
 
 They Desired a Better Country, J. W. D. Broughton'' (1981)

1824 births
1882 deaths
Canadian people of Cornish descent
English emigrants to pre-Confederation Ontario
Immigrants to Upper Canada
Ontario Liberal Party MPPs
People from Launceston, Cornwall
People from Northumberland County, Ontario